London North was a provincial electoral district in Ontario, Canada.  It was first created for the 1926 provincial election when the London riding was divided in two sections, and then eliminated prior to the 1934 provincial election when the city was re-configured as a single seat.  London North was re-established for the 1955 provincial election and retained until 1999, when most of its territory was integrated into the new riding of London North Centre.

The riding was Progressive Conservative bastion for most of its history, and was represented by both Premier John Robarts and cabinet minister Gordon Walker at different times.  Marvin Shore won the riding as a Liberal in 1975, and crossed the floor to the Progressive Conservatives the following year.  Liberal Ronald Van Horne won it back for his party in 1977, and held it until his retirement in 1988.  Progressive Conservative Dianne Cunningham was its final representative.

Members of Provincial Parliament

Electoral history

References

1925 establishments in Ontario
1955 establishments in Ontario
1934 disestablishments in Ontario
1999 disestablishments in Ontario
Former provincial electoral districts of Ontario